Bon Appétit Management Company is a Palo Alto, California-based on-site restaurant company, that provides café and catering services to corporations, colleges, and universities. The company is a subsidiary of the British multinational corporation Compass Group since 2002,  and operates over 1,000 cafes in 34 states.

In May 2018, Bon Appétit became the first food service provider and major restaurant company to ban plastic straws in all of its locations, with an exception for people with disabilities.

Sustainability initiatives

Bon Appétit has developed programs with Environmental Defense, the Monterey Bay Aquarium's Seafood Watch, the Humane Society of the United States, and other conservation organizations. It promotes the use of compostable materials.

References 

Catering and food service companies of the United States
Companies based in Palo Alto, California
Food and drink in the San Francisco Bay Area
Compass Group
Food and drink companies based in California
American subsidiaries of foreign companies
Food and drink companies established in 1987
American companies established in 1987
1987 establishments in California
2002 mergers and acquisitions